Ryan Cayabyab Singers is the 7-member musical group, headed by Ryan Cayabyab.

Current members
Poppert Bernadas
VJ Caber
Anthony Castillo
Nica Tupas
Celine Fabie
Erwin Lacsa
Kaye Tiuseco

About
World-renowned Filipino musician, Ryan Cayabyab, is the man behind the successful vocal groups Smokey Mountain, 14K and The San Miguel Master Chorale (SMMC). Smokey Mountain produced the likes of Geneva Cruz, Chedi Vergara, Jeffrey "Jepoy" Hidalgo while 14K boasts of Jolina Magdangal-Escueta and Von Arroyo. The SMMC was considered one of the premier choral groups in the country during its time.

Mr. C regained his status as a freelance professional musician and lost no time returning to his first love - writing and arranging for vocal groups. In the process, a new group known as RCS was born.

"Just last June (2007), I called for auditions for a new singing group, temporarily called the Ryan Cayabyab Singers, and by July, I had a brand new group - The RCS. Like Smokey Mountain, I envisioned this group to be a showcase of my new songs. But unlike Smokey Mountain, I wanted a more mature group as compared to a teen group," Mr. C said.

About 170 aspirants within the required 18-25 age range auditioned but only 37 were qualified for the callback auditions.

"From 37, I found about 18 good singers, made them go through more rigorous auditions and found 7 that I could see fit into my dream team," Mr. C said.

The lucky seven turned out to be Anezka Alvarez, Kaich Tiuseco, Kyla Rivera, Irra Cenina, Jaime Barcelon, Poppert Bernadas and Vincent Evangelista.

As RCS, they will be personally handled by Mr. C. and get first-hand training of his 35 years of musical experiences.

What will their music be?

"Their music…is actually my music, literally speaking. All the songs in their debut album are songs I have written: eight of them new, four are remakes. The tracks are eclectic like me but without any classical bent. They are mostly pop tracks with some mature themes, a couple of pseudo-dance tracks, a couple of R&B inspired tracks, a jazz-swing track, and a surprise track or two.

Mr. C sees RCS as more mature sounding compared to 14-K and Smokey Mountain and he believes it to be a powerhouse vocal group.

"I believe that this has got to be the most unique and most varied voice group so far. I am excited at how they can go in terms of musical mileage," he added.

Since the group's formation in 2007, they have released 3 full-length studio albums, and have performed for audiences around the world such as in Singapore, Malaysia, Hong Kong, Australia, the United States, and Canada. The group is currently on a month-long tour promoting their 3rd studio album "Sa Panaginip Lang" (2016, Curve Entertainment, INC.), as well as celebrating "100 Years of Pilipino Music", with performances in New York, San Francisco, Los Angeles, and Honolulu.

Discography

Studio albums

Awards
Best Performance by a New Group, AWIT Awards 2008
Best R&B Song for "Let Me Love You Tonight", AWIT Awards 2008

Websites
The RCS on Facebook
The RCS on Twitter
The RCS on Instagram

Musical groups established in 2009
Filipino pop music groups
Musical groups from Manila